The Lotto Cross Cup Brussels, also known as the IRIS Lotto Cross Cup, is an annual cross country running competition that takes place in mid-December in Brussels, Belgium. It is part of the Lotto Cross Cup series of races and is classed as an IAAF permit meeting, making athletes' performances eligible for qualification into the IAAF World Cross Country Championships.

Thousands of runners compete in the meeting each year, based in Laeken park, and amateur 5K and 10K races take place in addition to the professional races.  The meeting was postponed in 2008 because the European Cross Country Championships (previously scheduled to take place in Ostend) had to be moved to the Brussels course following difficulties due to the weather. The quality of the competition is high, with past winners including multiple world champions Paul Tergat and Kenenisa Bekele.

Past senior race winners

References

External links
Official Lotto Cross Cup series website

Cross country running competitions
Athletics in Belgium
Sport in Brussels
Cross country running in Belgium
Annual sporting events in Belgium